Shanghai United F.C (Simplified Chinese: 上海联城足球俱乐部) was a Chinese professional football club based in Shanghai, who last played in the 16,000 seater Yuanshen Sports Centre Stadium in the Chinese Super League. The club was founded by Dalian Shide F.C. on 1 February 2000 and was originally known as Dalian Sidelong. The club was initially used as youth team who were allowed to compete in the Chinese football league pyramid until the club was eventually sold to businessman Zhu Jun, the owner of China's second-largest online gaming company The9 in 2005. He moved the club to Shanghai until 2007 when he bought a majority share of inner-city rivals Shanghai Shenhua, thus began to merge the two clubs. Shanghai United no longer exists in name and is replaced by Shanghai Shenhua.

History
In 2004, Zhuhai Zobon F.C. played in the Chinese Football Association Jia League. When they won promotion to the Chinese Super League, their owners, Shanghai Zobon Real Estate Co., moved the team from Zhuhai to Shanghai, and renamed it to Shanghai Zobon F.C.. After the 2005 season they were again renamed to Shanghai United F.C..

Before the 2007 season, Zhu Jun bought a majority share in the in-city rival Shanghai Shenhua, thus began to merge the two clubs. Shanghai United no longer exists in name and is replaced by Shanghai Shenhua. The new Shenhua team combines players from the two original teams. Due to the merger, there are only 15 teams in the CSL.

Name history
2000–02: Dalian Sidelong (大连赛德隆)
2003: Zhuhai Anping (珠海安平)
2004: Zhuhai Zobon (珠海中邦)
2005: Shanghai Zobon (上海中邦)
2006–07: Shanghai United (上海联城)

Honours
Chinese Jia B League / China League One (Second Tier League)
Runners-up: 2002, 2004
Chinese Yi League / China League Two (Third Tier League)
Winners: 2001

Results
All-time league rankings

 no promotion

See also
 Shanghai Stars
 Shanghai Shenhua

References

External links
 Official site
 Gimenez to coach newly combined Shanghai Shenhua

Defunct football clubs in China
Football clubs in Shanghai
Association football clubs established in 2000
Association football clubs disestablished in 2007
2000 establishments in China
2007 disestablishments in China